Joseph C. Casdin was a three-term mayor of Worcester, Massachusetts, and the city's first Jewish mayor.

Early life
Casdin was born in Worcester to Simon and Ida (Ostroff) Cohen.

Business career
Casdin owned and operated the Jobbers Outlet, a clothing store founded by his father.

Public service

Worcester city council
Casdin was a member of the Worcester city council for thirteen terms, from 1956 to 1982.

Mayor of Worcester, Massachusetts
In accordance with the Worcester's weak mayor, Massachusetts Plan E city charter, the mayor was not popularly elected, but selected by the city council from among its members.  Casdin served first in 1959, then from September 1, 1962, to April 30, 1963, and again in 1967 to 1968.

Campaign for United States House of Representatives
In 1968 Casdin ran for the fourth congressional district seat in the United States House of Representatives. Casdin lost the Democratic primary against Harold Donohue.

Family life
Casdin married Miriam (Whitman) Casdin of Worcester, they had three children, two daughters and a son.

Death and burial
Casdin died at the Jewish Healthcare Center in Worcester on March 17, 2007. Casdin was buried in the B'nai B'rith Cemetery in Worcester.

References

Jewish American people in Massachusetts politics
Jewish mayors of places in the United States
Worcester, Massachusetts City Council members
Mayors of Worcester, Massachusetts
1914 births
2007 deaths
20th-century American politicians
Massachusetts Democrats
20th-century American Jews
21st-century American Jews